Ecsedi László Sportcentrum is a multi use stadium in Albertirsa, Hungary. It is mostly used for football matches. The tenants are Albertirsa SE and Ceglédi VSE.

Football venues in Hungary